General elections were held in British Guiana on 21 August 1961. The result was a victory for the People's Progressive Party, which won 20 of the 35 seats.

Electoral system
The elections were the first to be held under the 1961 constitution, which had created a bicameral Legislature with an appointed Senate and an elected Legislative Assembly. The 36 members of the Legislative Assembly included 35 members elected in single-member constituencies and the Speaker, who was elected by the other members. The 13 members of the Senate included eight nominated by the ruling party, three by the opposition and two by the Governor.

Campaign
A total of 98 candidates contested the elections. The PPP ran 29 candidates, the People's National Congress 35 and the United Force 34.

Results

Following the elections, the People's National Congress (PNC) were allocated two of the Senate seats reserved for the opposition, with one given to the United Force. The PNC claimed they should have been given all three seats, and its members attempted to block Governor Richard Luyt from entering the Legislature for its ceremonial opening on 6 October, requiring the police to remove them.

Aftermath
Although the PPP had only received 1.6% more of the vote than the new People's National Congress, it had won almost double the number of seats. This resulted in mass demonstrations led by the PNC, a general strike and severe inter-racial violence. After a few weeks the British authorities intervened by sending in troops and the Governor declared a state of emergency. Following these events, the country's electoral system was changed to use proportional representation. The first elections held under the new system took place in 1964.

References

British Guiana
Elections in Guyana
General election
British Guiana
British Guiana